In accelerator physics, the mean transverse energy (MTE) is a quantity that describes the variance of the transverse momentum of a beam. While the quantity has a defined value for any particle beam, it is generally used in the context of photoinjectors for electron beams.

Definition
For a beam consisting of  particles with momenta  and mass  traveling prominently in the  direction the mean transverse energy is given by

Where  is the component of the momentum  perpendicular to the beam axis . For a continuous, normalized distribution of particles  the MTE is

Relation to Other Quantities
Emittance is a common quantity in beam physics which describes the volume of a beam in phase space, and is normally conserved through typical linear beam transformations; for example, one may transition from a beam with a large spatial size and a small momentum spread to one with a small spatial size and a large momentum spread, both cases retaining the same emittance. Due to its conservation, the emittance at the species source (e.g., photocathode for electrons) is the lower limit on attainable emittance.

For a beam born with a spatial size  and a 1-D MTE the minimum 2-D ( and ) emittance is

The emittance of each dimension may be multiplied together to get the higher dimensional emittance. For a photocathode the spatial size of the beam is typically equal to the spatial size of the ionizing laser beam and the MTE may depend on several factors involving the
cathode, the laser, and the extraction field. Due to the linear independence of the laser spot size and the MTE, the beam size is often factored out, formulating the 1-D thermal emittance

Likewise, the maximum brightness, or phase space density, is given by

References 

Accelerator physics